Beaumaris Town Football Club was a Welsh football team based in Beaumaris, Anglesey, Wales.  They are four times champions of the Anglesey League. The club played in the Gwynedd League between 2002–03 and the end of the 2017–18 season, when they left the league.

Honours
Gwynedd League
Runners-up: 2002–03
Anglesey League
Champions (4): 1924–25, 1977–78, 1978–79, 2001–02
Dargie Cup
Winners (4): 1925–26, 1929–30, 1947–48, 1977–78
Elias Cup
Winners (2): 1971–72, 1972–73
Megan Cup
Winners (3): 1938–39, 1976–77, 2001–02
North Wales Coast FA Junior Challenge Cup
Winners (2): 1924–25, 2006–07

References

Anglesey League clubs
Gwynedd League clubs
Sport in Anglesey
Defunct football clubs in Wales
2018 disestablishments in Wales
Association football clubs disestablished in 2018
North Wales Coast League clubs